Santiago García may refer to:
 Santiago García (fencer) (1899–?), Spanish fencer
 Santiago García (Argentine footballer) (born 1988), Argentine footballer
 Santiago García (Uruguayan footballer) (1990–2021), Uruguayan footballer